zingmagazine is a contemporary art magazine composed of curatorial projects founded in 1995 by artist Devon Dikeou. zing began as a quarterly, black-and-white magazine. Its first issue contained projects by Kenny Schachter, Gordon Tapper, Ed Web, Gregory Volk, Donald Fergusson, Michael Corris, Amy Sillman, and Susan Robinson, and ran about 100 pages.

zing is now printed in color and has reached about 400 pages. Its curated projects have featured a variety of artistic mediums, including illustration, architecture, fashion, graphic design, music, painting, drawing, fiction, poetry, and critical reviews. Artists previously featured in zingmagazine include Kenneth Goldsmith, Rainer Ganahl, Spencer Finch, Zac Posen, Robert Antoni, Uscha Pohl, the Royal Art Lodge and, solo, Marcel Dzama.

Based in Manhattan's SoHo, the company also publishes books, CDs, posters, and other special projects. zingmagazine is affiliated with the Dikeou Collection in Denver, a non-profit contemporary art collection started by Devon Dikeou.

References

External links
 
 Dikeou Collection

Independent magazines
Magazines established in 1995
Magazines published in New York City
Quarterly magazines published in the United States
Visual arts magazines published in the United States